Pauline "Peggy" Ichkoff (née Widimier), is a former American international table tennis player.

Table tennis career
She won a bronze medal at the 1951 World Table Tennis Championships in the women's doubles with Leah Thall-Neuberger.

Hall of Fame
She was inducted into the USA Hall of Fame in 1987.

Personal life
She married Dick Ichkoff.

See also
 List of table tennis players
 List of World Table Tennis Championships medalists

References

American female table tennis players
World Table Tennis Championships medalists
Living people
Year of birth missing (living people)
20th-century American women